Callister may refer to:

Janette Callister Hales Beckham (1933–2022), general president of the Young Women organization of the Church of Jesus Christ of Latter-day Saints
Charles Warren Callister (1917–2008), American architect based in Tiburon, California
Cyril Callister (1893–1949), Australian chemist and food technologist who developed the Vegemite yeast spread
David Callister, MLC (1935–2020), Manx politician and broadcaster, who was a member of the Legislative Council of the Isle of Man
Kent Callister (born 1995), Australian snowboarder
Marion Jones Callister (1921–1997), American attorney and jurist in the District of Idaho
T. Brian Callister, American physician who works on care transitions
Tad R. Callister (born 1945), Sunday School General President of the Church of Jesus Christ of Latter-day Saints
Valerie Callister (born 1950), former Australian politician
William Callister MHK (1808–1872), timber importer from Ramsey who became a Member of the House of Keys
Thomas Callister Hales (born 1958), American mathematician working in representation theory, discrete geometry, and formal verification
E. R. Callister Jr. (1916–1980), American lawyer and politician

See also
Callister Park, sports facility located in East Vancouver
USS Callister
Calliaster
Calligaster
McCallister